Gianaclis is a neighbourhood in Alexandria, Egypt. It is named after the Greek-Egyptian businessman Nestor Gianaclis who established the Gianaclis Vineyards in Alexandria and, along with the Kyriazi Freres, founded the Egyptian cigarette industry.

Notable people from Gianaclis 

 Queen Farida of Egypt
 Mahmoud Sa'id, Egyptian artist

See also 

 Neighborhoods in Alexandria

External links 
 Alexandria Egypt Tourism

Neighbourhoods of Alexandria